Carteriospongia is a genus of sea sponges in the family Thorectidae.

There is some debate around the taxonomy of the group, with a 2021 molecular and morphological assessment of the subfamily Phyllospongiinae suggesting that Carteriospongia should become a synonym of Phyllospongia, and reinstating Carteriospongia flabellifera to its original designation of Polyfibrospongia flabellifera. The same study described 2 new species, designated Phyllospongia bergquistae sp. nov. and Polyfibrospongia kulit sp. nov..

Species 
 Carteriospongia contorta Bergquist, Ayling & Wilkinson, 1988
 Carteriospongia delicata Pulitzer-Finali, 1982
 Carteriospongia fissurella (de Laubenfels, 1948)
 Carteriospongia foliascens (Pallas, 1766)
 Carteriospongia mystica Hyatt, 1877
 Carteriospongia pennatula (Lamarck, 1813)
 Carteriospongia perforata Hyatt, 1877
 Carteriospongia silicata (Lendenfeld, 1889)
 Carteriospongia vermicularis (Lendenfeld, 1889)

References

External links 

Thorectidae
Sponge genera